Cronje is an Afrikaans surname, derived from the French Cronier. It may refer to:

Andrew Cronje (born 1984), South African field hockey player
Coert Cronjé (born 1988), South African rugby union player
Darryl Cronje (born 1967), South African swimmer
Erich Cronjé (born 1997), South African rugby union player
Ewie Cronje (1939–2020), South African cricketer
Frans Cronje, South African former cricketer
Gavin Cronje (born 1979), South African racing driver
Guy Cronjé (born 1989), South African-born Zimbabwean international rugby union footballer
Hansie Cronje (1969–2002), South African cricketer
Hermione Cronje, South African prosecutor
Jacques Cronjé (born 1982), South African rugby player
Johan Cronje (born 1982), South African Olympic athlete
Kenan Cronjé (born 1995), South African rugby union player
Lionel Cronjé (born 1989), South African rugby union footballer
Nicolene Cronje (born 1983), South African race walker
Peter Cronjé (1949–2020), South African rugby player
Piet Cronjé (1836–1911), South African general, Anglo-Boer Wars
Rowan Cronjé (1937–2014), Rhodesian/Zimbabwean politician
Ruan Cronje (born 2001), South African cricketer

Surnames of French origin
Surnames of Belgian origin
Afrikaans-language surnames